Eames is an unincorporated community in Skelton Township, Warrick County, in the U.S. state of Indiana.

History
A post office was established at Eames in 1882, and remained in operation until it was discontinued in 1894.

Geography

References

Unincorporated communities in Warrick County, Indiana
Unincorporated communities in Indiana